Harry Weldon (1 February 1881 – 10 March 1930) was an English comedian and music hall performer popular in the 1910s.

Life and career
Weldon was born James Henry Stanley in Liverpool, England on 1 February 1881.

He made his first stage appearance in the Tivoli Music Hall in Barrow in March 1900, making his London debut that year in the Marylebone Music Hall. He appeared with Fred Karno’s troupe and Charlie Chaplin in 1910 at the Nottingham Empire. He was known for having eyes that seemed always shut, and for speaking with a whistle - especially when saying his catchphrase: "'s no use". Among several comic characters, ‘Stiffy the Goal-keeper’ was perhaps the most popular. He performed at the Royal Variety Performance in 1922.

Weldon married twice: first on 29 August 1902, to Clarice Mabel Holt. They had a daughter, Mabel, in September 1906. The couple formally separated in March 1922, and divorced in 1925. Weldon's second marriage was in June 1926 to American Hilda Glyder, who was some 16 years younger than Clarice. Weldon died at 132 Maida Vale on 10 March 1930, leaving his widow just over £1,000. He is buried in Hampstead Cemetery. The Music Hall Guild of Great Britain and America restored Weldon's grave from a dilapidated state in or around 2017.

Widow and daughter
Weldon's widow, Hilda Glyder, was herself a popular music hall singer and comedienne. She returned to the stage for some years after Weldon's death. Walter Sickert painted her singing "You'd Be Surprised" in about 1923. Hilda remarried and died in New York in 1962. Weldon's daughter Mabel also went on the stage, as Maisie Weldon. There exists a 1941 British Pathé film clip of Maisie Weldon singing and doing impersonations, including one of her father.

References

External links

Harry Weldon: What Do You Want To Make Those Eyes For?
Harry Weldon: Stiffy The Goalkeeper
Harry Weldon: Sleuthy, The Dread Of The Heads (1918)
Harry Weldon: The White Hope

1881 births
1930 deaths
Music hall performers
Comedians from Liverpool
20th-century British comedians